"Me and My Baby" is a song co-written and recorded by American country music artist Paul Overstreet.  It was released in July 1992 as the first single from the album Love Is Strong.  The song reached #22 on the Billboard Hot Country Singles & Tracks chart. The song was written by Overstreet and Paul Davis.

It should not be confused with a song of the same name from the Broadway musical Chicago.

Chart performance

References

1992 singles
1992 songs
Paul Overstreet songs
Songs written by Paul Davis (singer)
Songs written by Paul Overstreet
Song recordings produced by Brown Bannister
RCA Records singles